Nöggerath is a relatively small lunar impact crater in the southwest section of the Moon. It is located to the northwest of Phocylides, and is pointed toward by the northern elongation of Schiller.  Nöggerath is a relatively unremarkable crater, with a smooth floor and a rim that is only slightly eroded and impacted at the southern edge.

Nöggerath lies north of the Schiller-Zucchius Basin.

Satellite craters
By convention these features are identified on lunar maps by placing the letter on the side of the crater midpoint that is closest to Nöggerath.

References

 
 
 
 
 
 
 
 
 
 
 
 

Impact craters on the Moon